Gillamoor  is a village and civil parish in the Ryedale 
district of the county of North Yorkshire, England. The population of the parish as taken at the 2001 census was 168, dropping to 156 at the 2011 census was 156. In 2015, North Yorkshire County Council estimated the population of the parish to be 150 people.

History
The village is mentioned in the Domesday Book as having 15 villagers and seven ploughlands. The name derives from Old English Getla's inga mōr; the moor of Getla's people (Getla being a personal name). In the 12th and 13th centuries, the spelling of the village was Gillemore.

In the 18th, 19th and 20th centuries, Gillamoor had water delivered via a channel cut by Joseph Foord. He created many miles of gently sloping leats that carried water from the moors into Fadmoor, Gillamoor and Kirkbymoorside. In 2000, the natural spring in the village was abandoned for a cut into the aquifer under the Vale of Pickering for fresh water.

Gillamoor is well known for its 'Surprise View'. At its eastern end, the road turns sharply to reveal an enchanting view of the eastern entrance to Farndale - the church wall plaque, close-by reads:

Thou, who hast given me eyes to see
and love this sight so fair,
give me a heart to find out thee,
and read thee everywhere.

The little church was rebuilt single-handedly in 1802 by James Smith of Farndale. The interior of St Aidans includes items from an earlier church, such as a balustrade that dates to 1682. The church was renovated again in 1880 and is now a grade II listed structure. A most unusual, complex, four-faced sundial stands by the roadside in the centre of the village. Like the church, this is now a grade II listed structure.

Apart from the Royal Oak Inn, the church, and the school, all buildings in the village are residential. Most of the village is within the boundaries of the North York Moors National Park. The former Wesleyan chapel in the village is now used as the school.

References

External links

Villages in North Yorkshire
Civil parishes in North Yorkshire